Psi Persei (Psi Per, ψ Persei, ψ Per) is a single Be star in the northern constellation of Perseus. It has an apparent visual magnitude of about 4.2, so it is visible to the naked eye at night under suitably dark skies.

Properties

This star has a stellar classification of B5Ve, which indicates it is a B-type main sequence star that is generating energy at its core through the nuclear fusion of hydrogen. It is a shell star with a circumstellar disc of gas surrounding the equator and extending out to about 11 times the radius of the star. As a result of this disc, the spectrum of this star shows emission lines (as indicated by the 'e' in the stellar class) and its magnitude varies over a period 1.021 days. The General Catalog of Variable Stars classifies Psi Persei as a gamma Cassiopeiae variable star, whose visual band brightness varies from magnitude 4.17 to 4.28.

Psi Persei is rotating rapidly with a projected rotational velocity (v sin i) along the equator of 390 km/s or more. It is expelling mass at the rate of about  times the mass of the Sun per year, or the equivalent of the Sun's mass every 20 million years. The rapid rotation causes Psi Persei to be an oblate shape, with the equatorial radius being  and the polar radius to be .

This star may be a member of the Alpha Persei Cluster, although its proper motion is high compared to other members.  Membership probabilities of 26% and 50% have been published from GALAH plus APOGEE data and from Gaia Data Release 2 data respectively.

Name and etymology
This star, together with δ Per, σ Per, α Per, γ Per and η Per, has been called the Segment of Perseus.

References

Persei, Psi
Persei, 37
Perseus (constellation)
Be stars
Alpha Persei Cluster
016826
022192
Durchmusterung objects
1087